Whore of the Orient is a cancelled action-adventure video game for Microsoft Windows, PlayStation 4 and Xbox One. The game was in development at KMM Interactive Entertainment, a subsidiary of Kennedy Miller Mitchell that comprised employees from defunct development houses Team Bondi and Krome Studios. In 2012, the game was targeting a 2015 release, but was confirmed cancelled in 2016, having not had a status update since 2013.

Setting
Set in 1936, the game would have centered around the corrupt city of Shanghai in the hands of Western powers, filled with mob crime and political troubles. The Kuomintang ruthlessly puts down labor movements in an effort to suppress communism, whilst the International Police Force attempt to maintain peace.

Development

Following the release of L.A. Noire (2011), Team Bondi sought partnerships with other studios for their next title, similar to their former partnership with Rockstar Games. It was reported that no studios were interested in forming a partnership due to prior claims of unethical working practices at Team Bondi. In August 2011, Kennedy Miller Mitchell (KMM) bought Team Bondi's assets and intellectual property, and staff were given the option to join KMM. The team was absorbed into KMM Interactive Entertainment, a subsidiary of Kennedy Miller Mitchell, and development on Whore of the Orient continued. Warner Bros. Interactive Entertainment was said to have pulled out from their interest in the project sometime in late 2012. In April 2013, it was rumoured that the former Team Bondi team was laid off, and that the game was put on hold. Doug Mitchell of Kennedy Miller Mitchell released a comment stating that the company had not given up on the project, and that they were still seeking the right investor, neither confirming nor denying the status of the former Team Bondi team. In June of that year, KMM received  worth of funding for the project from Screen NSW, an Australian trade and investment board.

The game was suggested to be a narrative action adventure title similar to L.A. Noire, and the proprietary facial MotionScan technology would also be reused. Early unfinished gameplay footage was leaked in August 2013, depicting the combat-style action. The title of the game was criticised in September 2013; Jieh-Yung Lo, a City of Monash Councillor, felt that the word "Orient" disgraces Chinese culture, and is "very similar to the N-word for African American communities".

In June 2016, an interview with Whore of the Orient producer Derek Proud revealed that the game was effectively cancelled. Proud revealed that the team fought to "the bitter end", but they were unable to save the game and ultimately it was "wrapped-up" by parent company KMM.

References

External links

Cancelled PlayStation 4 games
Cancelled Windows games
Cancelled Xbox One games
Team Bondi
Video games about police officers
Video games developed in Australia
Video games set in 1936
Video games set in Shanghai